Bercthun of  Beverley (died 15 May 733) also known as Bertin and Britwin, Berhthu or Beorhthun,  was an eighth century Anglo Saxon Saint.

He was a (Benedictine) monk of Beverley, a disciple of John of Beverley and Bede's informant about much of Bedes history regarding Beverley. Latter in life he became the Abbot of Beverley. He was also known from the secgan hagiographies.

A  Bust of Bercthun is thought to be kept in the British Library.
 
In 733 AD he died on the 15 May, on which day his feast was locally kept. A feast day was celebrated locally in his honour on the date of his death.

References

Year of birth unknown
733 deaths
Medieval English saints
8th-century Christian saints
7th-century births
Northumbrian saints
8th-century English clergy
Roman Catholic monks
English Christian monks
People from Beverley